Mattia Notari (born 20 May 1979) is an Italian football player who plays as a centre back. He played for Lierse SK from Belgium. He signed a contract at Mantova F.C. after leaving Novara Calcio.

External links

1979 births
Living people
Italian footballers
Italian expatriate footballers
Catania S.S.D. players
Novara F.C. players
Lierse S.K. players
Belgian Pro League players
Italian expatriate sportspeople in Belgium
Expatriate footballers in Belgium
Association football defenders